Salem Chapel is a former Congregational church, located on Hunslet Lane, Leeds, West Yorkshire, England. It is situated opposite the former Tetley's Brewery.

History 
Built in 1791 by the Rev Edward Parsons, Salem is the oldest surviving non-conformist chapel in Leeds city centre.

Salem Chapel is a Grade II listed building and its distinctive curved façade was added in 1906.

The historic chapel was the birthplace of Leeds United Football Club in 1919. Salem’s hall was the venue for a public meeting in which Leeds City F.C. was disbanded over financial misdemeanours, and Leeds United F.C. was formed.

The chapel was closed as a place of worship in 2001. The psychologist and writer Reverend Harry Guntrip preached the last sermon.

Present 
In 2009, the building was purchased by Professor Adam Beaumont, founder of telecommunications company aql. Beaumont funded the renovation and restoration of the chapel, which now houses aql’s head offices, as well as data centres, an exhibition space, a bar and a 370-seat glass-floored auditorium.

On 17 November 2011, Salem Chapel was awarded a blue plaque by the Leeds Civic Trust in recognition of its architectural and religious significance. The plaque was unveiled by the Lord Mayor of Leeds, Councillor Rev’d Alan Taylor.

As of April 2018, Salem Chapel is also home to the Estonian Consulate for the North of England and the Isle of Man.

Auditorium 
Salem Chapel is often used to host the launch of Government initiatives. In February 2015, Salem Chapel hosted the then-Prime Minister David Cameron and then-Chancellor of the Exchequer George Osborne for talks as part of the government's Northern Powerhouse proposal. Osborne returned to Salem Chapel in February 2017 with Lord Jim O'Neill to launch the inaugural Northern Powerhouse Partnership (NPP) report. In January 2018, it was used to launch Transport for the North's Strategic Transport Plan to transform transportation in the North of England over the next 30 years.

In addition to Cameron, Osborne and O'Neill, Salem Chapel's auditorium has hosted other notable figures for events and talks, including Britain's first astronaut Helen Sharman OBE and Bas Lansdorp, CEO and co-founder of Mars One, as part of 2018's Leeds International Festival; Tiina Intelmann, Estonian Ambassador to the United Kingdom, and Matt Hancock, Secretary of State for Digital, Culture, Media and Sport.

The launch of Leeds: Cradle of Innovation, a book on the history of innovation in the city by urban geographer Rachael Unsworth and local historian Steve Burt, was held at Salem Chapel on 14 June 2018.

It is among the venues used for Leeds Digital Festival and Leeds International Festival and has hosted the annual FinTech North since the event's inception.

Salem's ministers 

 1784–1833 – Rev Edward Parsons
 1833–1841 – Rev John Ely
 1841–1866 – Rev Wm. Hudswell
 1866–1875 – Rev Henry Tarrant
 1876–1890 – Rev George Hinds
 1891–1929 – Rev Bertram Smith; Rev Francis Wrigley
 1929–1933 – Rev Arthur Briggs
 1929–1938 – Rev Harry A. Turner
 1934–1946 – Rev Harry J.S. Guntrip
 1944–1946 – Rev Vernon Sproxton
 1946–1954 – Rev J. Norman Beard
 1949–1956 – Rev Reg. Williams
 1954–1968 – Rev Norman Charlton
 1966–1968 – Rev Jean Mortimer
 1969–? – Rev Graham J. Cook
 1976–1982 – Rev Adrienne Savage (sharing with Cottingley)
Also associated with Salem, the ministers of the South Leeds Team:
 1968–1973 – Rev Alice H. Platts
 1971–1976 – Rev Tony Addy
 1973–? – Rev Geoff. Rodham
 1977–? – Rev Simon Swailes
 1981–? – Rev Colin E. Richards

Gallery

See also 

 Architecture of Leeds
 List of places of worship in the City of Leeds

References 

Grade II listed churches in Leeds
Churches completed in 1791
Former churches in West Yorkshire
Congregational churches in West Yorkshire
Chapels in England
Leeds Blue Plaques